Duneane is a civil parish in County Antrim, Northern Ireland. It is situated in the historic barony of Toome Upper and contains the town of Toome.

The name derives from the Irish: Dun Ean (fort of the birds).

The parish is bounded by County Londonderry, the civil parishes of Portglenone and Drummaul, and to the south by Lough Neagh. It contains 48 townlands.

 

Townlands

A
Aghacarnaghan, Alder Rock, Annaghmore, Artlone

B
Ballycloghan, Ballydonnelly, Ballydugennan, Ballylenully, Ballylurgan, Ballymatoskerty, Ballynacooley, Ballynafey, Ballynamullan, Brockish

C
Cargin, Cargin Island, Carlane, Carmorn, Cloghogue, Creeve, Creggan

D
Derrygowan, Derryhollagh, Drumboe, Drumcullen, Drumderg, Drumraymond, Duck Island

G
Gallagh, Garriffgeery, Gortgarn, Gortgill, Greenan

H
Harvey's Rock

K
Killyfast

L
Lismacloskey

M
Moneyglass, Moneynick, Moneyrod, Muckrim, Mullaghgaun

R
Ranaghan

S
Staffordstown

T
Tamnaderry,  Tamnaghmore, Toome, Tullaghbeg

People
Henry Cooke (1788–1868) was an Irish presbyterian leader of the early and mid-nineteenth century. His first settlement was at Duneane, where he was ordained on 10 November 1808, though only 20 years old, as assistant to Robert Scott, with a pittance of £25 Irish. Here his evangelical fervour met with no sympathy. and on 13 November 1810 he resigned the post.
Roddy McCorley (died 1800) fought as part of United Irishmen in the Rebellion of 1798 and was hanged by the British at Toome Bridge.   A century later, he became the subject of a popular nationalist song by Ethna Carbery.    McCorley was born in Duneane and a nephew arranged his reburial in its parish graveyard in 1852.

See also
List of civil parishes of County Antrim

References